The 2000 NCAA Division I-AA football season, part of college football in the United States organized by the National Collegiate Athletic Association (NCAA) at the Division I-AA level, began in August 2000, and concluded with the 2000 NCAA Division I-AA Football Championship Game on December 16, 2000, at Finley Stadium in Chattanooga, Tennessee. The Georgia Southern Eagles won their sixth I-AA championship, defeating the Montana Grizzlies by a score of 27–25.

Conference changes and new programs

Conference standings

Conference champions

Postseason

NCAA Division I-AA playoff bracket

* By team name denotes host institution

* By score denotes overtime

Source:

References